The second season of The Four Brasil, hosted by Xuxa Meneghel and judged by Aline Wirley, João Marcello Bôscoli and new judge Paulo Miklos, premiered on Sunday, March 8, 2020, at 6:00 p.m. / 5:00 p.m. (BRT / AMT) on RecordTV. The season was previously slated to premiere on Friday, February 14, 2020, at 10:30 p.m. Starting on week 3, the show moved back to the first season's timeslot on Wednesdays at 10:30 p.m. due to low ratings.

This season was originally scheduled to last for 10 weeks. However, on March 17, 2020, RecordTV suspended taping for all of their shows due to the coronavirus pandemic in Brazil. As a result, the four contestants remaining at the end of the last recorded episode (week 8 episode) automatically became the Final Four of the season.

On April 29, 2020, a live segment was hosted by Xuxa Meneghel, featuring the judges and a group performance by the contestants from their homes, to open the vote for the winner.

Alma Thomas, who remained undefeated throughout the entirety of the season, won the competition with 50.58% of the public vote over Lucas Degasperi (26.69%), Sabrina Meirels (14.20%) and Ana Clemesha (8.53%), who came in second, third and fourth place respectively.

The Four
Key
 – Challenger against The Four won and secured a seat as a new member.
 – Member of The Four did not perform.
 – Member of The Four won the challenge and secured a seat.
 – Member of The Four lost the challenge and was eliminated.
 – Artist was not in the competition.
 – Final member of The Four.

Challenge episodes
Key
 – Artist secured a spot and has remained in The Four.
 – Artist won the challenge but was eventually eliminated.
 – Artist was eliminated.

Week 1 (Mar. 08)

Week 2 (Mar. 15)
Group performance: "Born to Be Wild" / "Born This Way"

Week 3 (Mar. 25)
Group performance: "Eye of the Tiger"

Week 4 (Apr. 01)
Group performance: "Under Pressure"

Week 5 (Apr. 08)
Group performance: "Apenas Mais Uma de Amor" / "Love of My Life"

Week 6 (Apr. 15)
Group performance: "Você Não Serve Pra Mim"

Week 7 (Apr. 22)
Group performance: "The Way You Make Me Feel"

Week 8 (Apr. 29)
Group performance: "Girl on Fire"

Finale

Week 8 (Apr. 29)

Following the announcement that Thomas had won, she performed "Balada do Louco".

Ratings and reception

Brazilian ratings
All numbers are in points and provided by Kantar Ibope Media.

References

External links
 The Four Brasil on R7.com

2020 Brazilian television seasons
Television series impacted by the COVID-19 pandemic